Beyond the Edge may refer to:

Beyond the Edge (2013 film), a 2013 New Zealand docudrama
Beyond the Edge (2016 film), a 2016 American science-fiction film
Beyond the Edge (2018 film), a 2018 Russian fantasy film
Beyond the Edge (TV series), a CBS television series